Manuel Aguirre y Monsalbe (1822–1856) was a Spanish painter, active during the 19th century in Aragon. He was born in Málaga, and became  a pupil of Vicente López y Portaña. In 1846, he became professor at the Academy of San Luis in Zaragoza. He painted a collection of portraits of the Kings of Aragon for the Casino in that city.

References

1822 births
1856 deaths
People from Málaga
19th-century Spanish painters
19th-century Spanish male artists
Spanish male painters
Painters from Andalusia